The South-east wall (German: Südostwall) (also known as Reichsschutzstellung) was a system of fortifications planned by Nazi Germany in the late stages of World War II to extend along the Little Carpathians and Lake Neusiedl southwards to the River Drau. Not a wall in the true sense of the word, the  South-east wall was rather a series of German batteries and anti-tank ditches built at strategic locations alongside the southeastern border of the German Reich in 1944/45 with the intention of stopping the Red Army. The defensive line was only partly finished when the Red Army reached the line in March 1945, and merely slowed the speed of their offensive. The Red Army broke through the line at the beginning of the Vienna Offensive.

References

Military installations of the Wehrmacht
World War II defensive lines